Ralph Michael Ineson (born 15 December 1969) is an English actor and narrator. Known for his deep, rumbling, Yorkshire-accented voice, his most notable roles include William in The Witch, Dagmer Cleftjaw in Game of Thrones, Amycus Carrow in the last three Harry Potter films, Donald Bamford in the BBC drama series Goodnight Sweetheart, Chris Finch in the BBC sitcom The Office, Nikolai Tarakanov in the HBO historical drama miniseries Chernobyl, and the title character in The Green Knight.

Early life
Ralph Michael Ineson was born in Leeds on 15 December 1969, and educated at Woodleigh School and Pocklington School. In the early 1990s, after studying theatre at Lancaster University's Furness College, he worked as a teacher and cricket coach at York Sixth Form College.

Career

Television
He played the recurring character Chris Finch in the BBC comedy The Office. He starred as Donald Bamford in the sitcom Goodnight Sweetheart, as Zack in the soap opera Coronation Street, and played ex-soldier Sam Walker in the first series of Spooks. He played Luke Mullen in the BBC drama Playing the Field. He had a minor part in episode four of the first series of BBC drama This Life. He starred in Suburban Shootout, which aired on Paramount Comedy and Five. He played Frank Monk in series 7 of Waking The Dead in the episode "Wounds". He played Dagmer Cleftjaw in the second season of HBO's Game of Thrones. He also appeared in an Imperial Leather advert as a fireman.

Ineson had a minor role in the fifth and sixth series of BBC drama Waterloo Road in 2009 playing the role of Jon Fry. He had a small role in an episode of Channel 4 comedy The IT Crowd, as Paul, a buttock-kissing masseur, in the series four episode "Something Happened". In the 2012 ITV Titanic mini-series he played Steward Hart. In 2016, he appeared in the third season of the BBC Two series Peaky Blinders, playing the part of Connor Nutley.

Film
Ineson's Hollywood film credits include First Knight, From Hell, Sex & Drugs & Rock & Roll and a brief role in The Damned United. He played Amycus Carrow, a Death Eater, in Harry Potter and the Half-Blood Prince, Harry Potter and the Deathly Hallows – Part 1 and Part 2. He also appeared in the 2008 film Cass, as Sergeant Mullins.

In 2014, he appeared in the Marvel Studios film Guardians of the Galaxy. Also in 2014, he had a small role in the spy film Kingsman: The Secret Service, playing a policeman who interviews Eggsy.

He played William alongside Anya Taylor-Joy and Kate Dickie in Robert Eggers's critically acclaimed debut film The Witch, which saw Eggers win Best Director at the 2015 Sundance Film Festival.

Ineson appeared in a minor role as a First Order officer in the 2017 film Star Wars: The Last Jedi. His role was originally bigger, but most of his performance ended up on the cutting room floor. The cut material is available in a deleted scene on the 2018 Blu-ray release of the film.

Voice work
Ineson has used his distinctive Yorkshire accent in a variety of voice-over work. He has narrated TV programmes Licence to Drill, Salvage Hunters on the Discovery Channel, the 2010 Sky TV series Inside Gatwick, and the BBC1 series Claimed and Shamed.

In the 2012–2013 BBC Radio 4 dramatisations of the ten Martin Beck police novels by Maj Sjöwall and Per Wahlöö, Ineson played policeman Gunvald Larsson.

In 2013, he voiced the Channel 4 series Skint which followed the lives of British families from underprivileged backgrounds. In 2015, he narrated Countryside 999 on BBC One. In 2009 he narrated the BBC One documentary Series Gears and Tears which follows the characters of British BriSCA Formula 1 Stock Cars.

Ineson previously served as the narrator in a series of commercials for Newcastle Brown Ale.

TV adverts that have used his voice include: lastminute.com, Dacia cars, Gaviscon and Wickes. He also did the Sky Bet adverts during Sky Sports football coverage.

In video games, Ineson returned to voice Amycus Carrow in the video game adaptation of Harry Potter and the Deathly Hallows – Part 2, and gave his voice and likeness for the infamous pirate Charles Vane in Assassin's Creed IV: Black Flag.

Ineson has also voiced a number of trails and station idents for national commercial radio station talkSPORT in the early 2000s.

Personal life
Ineson married Ali Milner, the editor of make-up artist magazine Warpaint, at Cliveden in December 2003. They have a son named Luc (born 1999) and a daughter named Rebecca (born 2003). 

Ineson supports Leeds United Football Club.

Filmography

Film

Television

Stage

Video games

Awards and nominations

References

External links

Ralph Ineson: BBC's The Office

1969 births
20th-century English male actors
21st-century English male actors
Alumni of Lancaster University
Alumni of Furness College, Lancaster
English male film actors
English male radio actors
English male stage actors
English male television actors
English male voice actors
Male actors from Leeds
Living people
People educated at Pocklington School